A party of Islamists rebels ambushed a squadron of Chadian soldiers during a "clean-up operations" in the Adrar des Ifoghas mountains. Heavy gun-fire was exchanged between the two leading to a brief standoff. A soldier was killed by a stray bullet during the confrontation that also led to the deaths of six rebels. A pick-up truck was taken with five Islamists.

References

Tigharghar
2013 in Mali
Tigharghar
Tigharghar
March 2013 events in Africa

Battles in 2013